A freight forwarder, or forwarding agent, is a person or a company who, for a fee, organizes shipments for the shipper (an individual/party that arranges an item for shipment) by liaising with carriers (an individual/party that transports goods). A forwarder does not move the goods but acts as an agent in the logistics network.

The carriers can use a variety of shipping modes, including ships, airplanes, trucks, and railroads, and often use multiple modes for a single shipment. For example, the freight forwarder may arrange to have cargo moved from a plant to an airport by truck, flown to the destination city and then moved from the airport to a customer's building by another truck.

International freight forwarders typically handle international shipments and have additional expertise in preparing and processing customs documentation and performing activities pertaining to international shipments.

Information typically reviewed by a freight forwarder includes the commercial invoice, shipper's export declaration, bill of lading and other documents required by the carrier or country of export, import, and/or transshipment.

The FIATA shorthand description of the freight forwarder as the "Architect of Transport" illustrates the commercial position of the forwarder relative to its client. In Europe, some forwarders specialize in "niche" areas such as rail-freight, and collection and deliveries around a large port. Modern freight forwarders offer an end-to-end process i.e. shipping the goods from the place of origin to the final destination. Together with Freight Tracking Technology, freight forwarding agents can view real time freight information.

History

One of the earliest freight forwarders was Thomas Meadows and Company Limited of London, England, established in 1835
. According to "Understanding the Freight Business," written and published by the executive staff of Thomas Meadows and Company in 1972, the advent of reliable rail transport and steamships created demand for the fledgling freight forwarding industry. Trade developed between Europe and North America, creating additional demand. The first international freight forwarders were innkeepers in London who held and re-forwarded the personal effects of their hotel guests.

The original function of the forwarder was to arrange for carriage by contracting with various carriers. Forwarder responsibilities included advice on documentation and customs requirements in the country of destination. His correspondent agent overseas looked after his customers' goods and kept him informed about matters that would affect the movement of goods.

In modern times, the forwarder accepts the same responsibilities. It operates either as a domestic carrier or otherwise with a corresponding agent overseas or with his own branch-office. In a single transaction, the forwarder may be acting as a carrier (principal) or as an agent for his customer or both.

Document transfer fee/document handover fee 

International freight forwarders, Non-Vessel-Operating Common Carriers (NVOCCs), and customs brokers often charge for transferring documents to another transportation company at the destination. This fee is a part of the ocean freight charges, being paid by the importer at the port of discharge in the International Commercial Term (incoterm) FOB (free on board), and by the exporter at the origin in the incoterms CFR (cost and freight), CIF (cost, insurance and freight) and DDP (Transportation cost from factory to delivery port, custom clearance at delivery port, freight, custom clearance at discharge port, transportation from discharge port to importer factory). This fee is separate from documentation fees charged by carriers and NVOCCs as part of the freight charges on a bill of lading and is separate from other fees for document preparation or for the release of cargo.

National variations

Australia
In Australia most licensed Customs Clearance Agents (commonly referred to as Customs Brokers) operate under a freight forwarder.

United Arab Emirates
UAE freight forwarders are well-versed in the complexities of shipping to and from the Emirates, and can provide a valuable resource for businesses looking to move goods in and out of the country. They can help to navigate the often-complex customs regulations in the UAE, and can also offer advice on the best shipping routes and carriers to use.

Bangladesh
Freight forwarders must have a government license in Bangladesh.

Canada
Transport Canada is the federal department responsible for implementing and enforcing transportation policies and programs. The Canada Border Services Agency is responsible for enforcing most regulations that affect international freight forwarders. International security measures are the dominant concern.

The Canadian International Freight Forwarders Association (CIFFA) was established in 1948 to support and protect the character, status, and interest of foreign freight forwarders by establishing uniform trade practice and regulations. CIFFA also plays an educational role by providing certificate and advanced certificate programs.

India
Federation of Freight Forwarders’ Associations in India (FFFAI)
  is the Apex Body and the Sole Representative of 28 Member Associations from all over India representing 6,500 Custom House Agents (employing over 1.1 lakh people).

Ireland
International merchandise trade is worth €148 billion to the Irish economy. 82% of manufactured products are exported, further highlighting the importance of freight forwarders to the national economy. Associations including the Irish International Freight Association and FIATA help maintain the professionalism of this industry through educational and representative roles. FIATA offers a Diploma in Freight Forwarding.

Kenya and Tanzania
In Kenya and Tanzania freight forwarders are commonly referred to as clearing and forwarding agents. A license is required, which can be acquired from Kenya Revenue Authority and Tanzania Revenue Authority respectively. Freight forwarders in Kenya and Tanzania are responsible for clearing consignments through Kenya and Tanzania customs, arranging transportation and forwarding the consignment to the consignee. Both exports and imports must clear customs in Kenya/ Tanzania.

Nigeria
Freight-forwarding in Nigeria has been in place since the exporting of groundnut as a cash crop beginning in 1914, though not initially as freight forwarding but as the means of transportation of goods and services from one country to another. Following the method of their British forebears, agents were used to facilitating the transport of goods and services.

Pakistan
Pakistan International Freight Forwarders Association PIFFA has more than 500 freight forwarding companies as members. The association is the local representative of FIATA and member association for Pakistan.

United Kingdom
In the U.K., freight forwarders are not licensed, but many are members of BIFA (The British International Freight Association). BIFA is the trade association for UK-registered companies engaged in the international movement of freight by all modes of transport, air, road, rail, and sea. BIFA has around 1500 corporate members, known generally as freight forwarders, who offer a wide range of services within these various modes.

United States
Companies handling domestic US freight by road must be registered with the U.S. Department of Transportation's Federal Motor Carrier Safety Administration.  Such forwarders are "carriers" who accept freight for transport and are liable for delivering the freight under their own bill of lading.

International ocean freight forwarders arranging for shipments to and from the US must be licensed by the Federal Maritime Commission as Ocean Transportation Intermediaries. An Ocean Transportation Intermediary is either an ocean freight forwarder or a non-vessel-operating common carrier (NVOCC). An ocean freight forwarder is "an individual or company in the United States that dispatches shipments from the United States via common carriers and books or otherwise arranges space for those shipments on behalf of shippers; ocean freight forwarders prepare and process documentation and perform related activities pertaining to shipments." An NVOCC is "a common carrier that holds itself out to the public to provide ocean transportation, issues its own bills of lading or equivalent documents, but does not operate the vessels that transport cargo"; or, "a shipper in its relationship with the vessel-operating common carrier involved in the movement of cargo."

See also
 Logistics
 Physical inventory
 Standard trading conditions
 Supply chain

References

Freight transport